The Toy Show Quality is an Australian Turf Club Group 3 Thoroughbred horse race for three-year-old fillies and older mares, run as a quality handicap over a distance of 1300 metres at Randwick Racecourse, Sydney, Australia in August. Total prize money for the race is A$160,000.

History

The race is named in honour of the champion filly Toy Show, who won the 1975 Golden Slipper Stakes, The Thousand Guineas and 1976 Newmarket Handicap.

Distance
 1995–1999 – 1400 metres
 2000–2001 – 1300 metres
 2002–2010 – 1400 metres
 2011 onwards - 1300 metres

Grade
 1995–2012 - Listed race
 2013 onwards - Group 3

Venue
 1995–1996 - Randwick Racecourse
1997–1999 - Warwick Farm Racecourse 
2000 - Canterbury Park Racecourse
2001–2004 - Warwick Farm Racecourse 
 2005–2006 - Randwick Racecourse
 2008 - Warwick Farm Racecourse
 2009 - Randwick Racecourse
2010–2013 - Warwick Farm Racecourse
 2014 onwards - Randwick Racecourse

Winners

 2021 - Fituese   
 2020 - Sweet Deal
 2019 - Mizzy
 2018 - Egyptian Symbol
 2017 - Sweet Redemption
 2016 - Pearls
 2015 - Amicus 
 2014 - My Sabeel 
 2013 - Hidden Kisses
2012 - Dystopia
2011 - Red Tracer
2010 - Illuminates
2009 - Moti
2008 - Kishkat
2007 - †race not held
2006 - Walk Alone
2005 - Nevis 
2004 - Catreign 
2003 - Arrabeea 
2002 - Youhadyourwarning 
2001 - Winona 
2000 - Chiming Lass 
1999 - Fairytales 
1998 - Sash 
1997 - Captivating 
1996 - Macrosa 
1995 - Joie Denise 

† Not held because of outbreak of equine influenza

See also
 List of Australian Group races
 Group races

External links 
Toy Show Quality (ATC)

References

Horse races in Australia